Psalm 137 is the 137th psalm of the Book of Psalms in the Tanakh. In English it is generally known as "By the rivers of Babylon", which is how its first words are translated in the King James Version of the Bible. Its Latin title is "Super flumina Babylonis".

This psalm is Psalm 136 in the slightly different numbering system of the Greek Septuagint and the Latin Vulgate versions of the Bible. 

The psalm is a communal lament about remembering Zion, and yearning for Jerusalem while dwelling in exile during the Babylonian captivity. The psalm forms a regular part of liturgy in Jewish, Eastern Orthodox, Catholic, Lutheran, Anglican and other Protestant traditions. It has often been set to music and paraphrased in hymns.

Context and content

After Nebuchadnezzar II's successful siege of Jerusalem in 597 BC, and subsequent campaigns, inhabitants of the Kingdom of Judah were deported to Babylonia, where they were held captive until some time after the Fall of Babylon (539 BC). The rivers of Babylon are the Euphrates river, its tributaries, and the Tigris river.

Psalm 137 is a hymn expressing the yearnings of the Jewish people during their Babylonian exile. In its whole form of nine verses, the psalm reflects the yearning for Jerusalem as well as hatred for the Holy City's enemies with sometimes violent imagery.

Rabbinical sources attributed the poem to the prophet Jeremiah, and the Septuagint version of the psalm bears the superscription: "For David. By Jeremias, in the Captivity."

Verses 1–4
The early lines of the psalm describe the sadness of the Israelites in exile, while remembering their homeland, weeping and hanging their harps on trees. Asked to "sing the Lord's song in a strange land", they refuse.

Methodist writer Joseph Benson reflects on the "inexpressible pathos ... in these few words! How do they, at once, transport us to Babylon, and place before our eyes the mournful situation of the Israelitish captives! Driven from their native country, stripped of every comfort and convenience, in a strange land among idolaters, wearied and broken-hearted, they sit in silence by those hostile waters." He argues that the reference to harps reflects "all instruments of music" and that the words can probably be interpreted to mean that the singers were Levites used to the performance of music in the service of the temple.

Verses 5–6
In verses 5–6 the speaker turns into self-exhortation to remember Jerusalem:

Verses 7–9
The psalm ends with prophetic predictions of violent revenge.

Liturgical uses

Judaism
The psalm is customarily recited on Tisha B'Av and by some during the nine days preceding Tisha B'Av, commemorating the destruction of the Temples in Jerusalem.

Psalm 137 is traditionally recited before the Birkat Hamazon (Grace After Meals) on a weekday. However, on Shabbat and Jewish holidays, and at the celebratory meal accompanying a Jewish wedding, brit milah, or pidyon haben, Psalm 126 is recited before the Birkat Hamazon instead.

Verses 5 and 6 are customarily said by the groom at Jewish wedding ceremony shortly before breaking a glass as a symbolic act of mourning over the destruction of the Temple. Verse 7 is found in the repetition of the Amidah on Rosh Hashanah.

Psalm 137 is one of the ten Psalms of the Tikkun HaKlali of Rebbe Nachman of Breslov.

Eastern Christianity
In the Eastern Orthodox Church and those Eastern Catholic Churches that use the Byzantine Rite, Psalm 137 (known by its Septuagint numbering as Psalm 136) is a part of the Nineteenth Kathisma (division of the Psalter) and is read at Matins on Friday mornings throughout the year, except during Bright Week (the week following Easter Sunday) when no psalms at all are read. During most of Great Lent it is read at Matins on Thursday and at the Third Hour on Friday, but during the fifth week of Great Lent it is read at Vespers on Tuesday evening and at the Third Hour on Friday.

This psalm is also solemnly chanted at Matins (Orthros) after the Polyeleos on the three Sundays preceding the beginning of Great Lent.

Western Christianity
Following the rule of St. Benedict (530 AD), the Roman Breviary adopted the "Super flumina Babylonis" psalm for Vespers on Wednesdays. In the Roman Missal, before the Vatican II reforms, the first verse of the psalm was the Offertory in the Mass on the 20th Sunday after Pentecost.

In Lutheranism, a well-known hymn based on the psalm has been associated with a Gospel reading in which Jesus foretells and mourns the destruction of Jerusalem.

After the Second Vatican Council, the last three verses of the psalm were removed from Catholic liturgical books because of their cruelty perceived to be incompatible with the gospel message. In the post-Vatican II three-year cycle of the Catholic mass liturgy, the psalm is part of the service on Laetare Sunday, that is the fourth Sunday in Lent, of the "B" cycle.

Similarly, the Prayer Book of the Anglican Church of Canada has also removed these verses.

Translations, versifications and settings

The psalm has been set to music by many composers. Many settings omit the last verse. The hymnwriter John L. Bell comments alongside his own setting of this Psalm: "The final verse is omitted in this metricization, because its seemingly outrageous curse is better dealt with in preaching or group conversation. It should not be forgotten, especially by those who have never known exile, dispossession or the rape of people and land."

16th to 18th century
Latin settings ("Super flumina Babylonis") as four-part motets were composed by Costanzo Festa, Nicolas Gombert, Giovanni Pierluigi da Palestrina and Orlando Lassus. Philippe de Monte and Tomas Luis de Victoria set the text for eight parts. French Baroque settings were written by Henry Dumont, Marc-Antoine Charpentier, 2 settings, H.170 (1670) and H.171-H.171 a (? late 1670) and Michel-Richard Delalande.

Wolfgang Dachstein's "An Wasserflüssen Babylon", a German rhymed paraphrase and setting of the psalm, was first published in 1525. It was soon adopted as a Lutheran hymn, and appeared in publications such as the Becker Psalter. A manuscript written in the early 17th century and a 1660s print illustrate that Dachstein's version of the psalm was adopted in Ashkenazi culture. Four-part chorale settings of Dachstein's hymn were realised by, among others, Johann Hermann Schein and Heinrich Schütz. Schütz also set Luther's prose translation of Psalm 137 ("An den Wassern zu Babel", SWV 37, included in the Psalmen Davids, Op. 2, 1619). Organ compositions based on Dachstein's hymn include Johann Adam Reincken's An Wasserflüssen Babylon, and one of Johann Sebastian Bach's Great Eighteen Chorale Preludes.

The first composition in Eustache Du Caurroy's Meslanges de la musique, published in 1610, a year after the composer's death, is "Le long des eaux, ou se bagne", a six-part setting of Gilles Durant de la Bergerie's paraphrase of Psalm 137. Salamone Rossi (1570–1630) set the psalm in Hebrew (עַל נַהֲרוֹת בָּבֶל, Al naharot Bavel) for four parts. Matthew Locke's Super flumina Babylonis motet is an extended setting of the first nine verses of the psalm. The psalm's first two verses were used for a musical setting in a round by English composer Philip Hayes. William Billings adapted the text to describe the British occupation of Boston in his anthem "Lamentation over Boston".

Artemy Vedel composed two choral concertos based on the psalm in Ukrainian, Na rekakh Vavilonskikh.

19th century
Lord Byron's "We sat down and wept by the waters", a versified paraphrase of Psalm 137, was published in his Hebrew Melodies in 1815. The poetry was set by, among others, Isaac Nathan (1815) and Samuel Sebastian Wesley. The poem was translated in French by Alexis Paulin Paris, and in German by Adolf Böttger. Another German translation was set by Ferruccio Busoni ("An Babylons Wassern wir weinten" in Zwei hebräische Melodien von Lord Byron, BV 202, 1884).

Psalm 137 was the inspiration for the famous slave chorus "Va, pensiero" from Giuseppe Verdi's opera Nabucco (1842). Charles-Valentin Alkan's piano piece Super flumina Babylonis: Paraphrase, Op. 52 (1859), is in the printed score preceded by a French translation of Psalm 137. Charles Gounod set "Près du fleuve étranger", a French paraphrase of the psalm, in 1861. In 1866 this setting was published with Henry Farnie's text version, as "By Babylon's wave: Psalm CXXXVII".

In 1863, Gabriel Fauré  wrote a Super Flumina Babylonis for mixed chorus and orchestra. Peter Cornelius based the music of his paraphrase of Psalm 137, "An Babels Wasserflüssen", Op. 13 No. 2 (1872), on the "Sarabande" of Bach's third English Suite. Czech composer Antonín Dvořák (1841–1904) set verses 1–5 to music as No. 7 of his Biblical Songs (1894).

20th and 21st centuries
20th and 21st-century settings based on, or referring to, Psalm 137 include:
 Super flumina Babylonis (1916) for mixed choir and organ, by Jules Van Nuffel.
 In William Walton's Belshazzar's Feast, a 1931 cantata, a version of the opening section is set to music, as if sung by the Israelite captives in Babylon.
 The second of the Two Psalms by Harry Partch (1901–1974) is "By the Rivers of Babylon", which he recorded in 1942 in a version for voice, chromelodeon and adapted viola.
 An English setting ("By the Rivers of Babylon") by David Amram (b. 1930), for solo soprano and SSAA choir (1969).
 "Rivers of Babylon", in part based on the opening verses of the Psalm, is a Rastafarian song written and recorded by Brent Dowe and Trevor McNaughton of the Jamaican reggae group The Melodians in 1970. It is featured in the 1972 film The Harder They Come and well known through its hit single 1978 rendition by Boney M. In 1992, the rock/reggae group Sublime released a live cover of the song on their 40oz. to Freedom album.
 The psalm was set, as On the Willows, in the Stephen Schwartz Broadway musical Godspell (1971).
 Don McLean covered Hayes's round as "Babylon", which was the final track on his 1971 album American Pie. Another cover of the round was featured at the end of the episode "Babylon" during the first season of Mad Men.
 Estonian composer Arvo Pärt composed An den Wassern zu Babel saßen wir und weinten in 1976 (revised 1984).
 In 1981, Herbert Sumsion composed In Exile, a motet for double choir on verses 1–6, premiered at the Gloucester Cathedral.
The psalm was the inspiration for Leonard Cohen's "By the Rivers Dark" on his 2001 album Ten New Songs.
 Psalm 137:5–6 is the basis for the chorus of Matisyahu's single "Jerusalem" (2006).
 Psalm 137 is the central text of John Tavener's "Lament for Jerusalem – a mystical love song".
 The artist Fernando Ortega based the song "City of Sorrows" on Psalm 137.
 "I Hung My Harp Upon the Willows" is a song by The Trashcan Sinatras about poet Robert Burns.
 It is referenced in The Mountain Goats' "September 15th 1983" off of Heretic Pride.
 Psalm 137:1–4 is the basis for "By These Rivers" for solo recorder (2022) by Gilad Hochman.

In literature

The title of William Faulkner's If I Forget Thee, Jerusalem (1939).
The Portuguese 16th century poet Luís de Camões's poem Sôbolos rios que vão por Babilónia is based on Psalm 137.
Welsh poet Evan Evans' work "A Paraphrase of Psalm CXXXVII" is a direct answer to Psalm 137 and parallels the plight of the Welsh bards with that of the Jews in the psalm.
In Samuel Richardson's 1740 novel Pamela; or, Virtue Rewarded, Pamela adapts psalm 137 to describe her spiritual exile from home.

Phrases from the psalm have been referenced in numerous works, including:
In the third stanza, The Fire Sermon, of T. S. Eliot's 1922 poem The Waste Land line 182 is: 'By the waters of Leman I sat down and wept...'. Leman is both the French for Lake Geneva and an archaic word for "mistress".
"By the Waters of Babylon", 1937 short story by Stephen Vincent Benét.
By Grand Central Station I Sat Down and Wept, 1945 prose poem by Elizabeth Smart.
The Italian poet Salvatore Quasimodo quoted the psalm in his 1947 poem "On the Boughs of the Willows".
"If I Forget Thee, Oh Earth", a short story written by Arthur C. Clarke and first published in 1951 in the magazine Future.
By the River Piedra I Sat Down and Wept, 1994 novel by Paulo Coelho.
In Job: A Comedy of Justice by Robert A. Heinlein, the last line of this psalm is referenced to depict the potential nature of God.
In Book X, Chapter 7 of The Brothers Karamazov, Captain Snegiryov quotes verses 5 and 6.
In the 2010 video game Fallout New Vegas, in the Honest Hearts DLC, Joshua Graham quotes Psalm 137, likening the Babylonian captivity of the Jews to the White Legs' war with two other tribes, the Dead Horses and the Sorrows.
In the 2021 debut of the comic, "King Spawn", writer Sean Lewis and Spawn creator Todd McFarlane introduce a cult called "Psalm 137" which initiates a terrorist campaign targeting children.

Historical instances of use

 Pope Gregory X quoted Psalm 137 ("If I forget thee, O Jerusalem, let my right hand forget her cunning") before departing from the Crusades upon his election by the papal conclave, 1268–1271.
 In his "What to the Slave Is the Fourth of July?" speech, Frederick Douglass compared the Rochester Ladies' Anti-Slavery Society asking him to deliver their Fourth of July speech to the actions of the antagonists asking the Jews to sing in a foreign land.

References

Sources

External links 

 
 
 By the rivers of Babylon text and footnotes, usccb.org United States Conference of Catholic Bishops
 Psalm 137:1 introduction and text, biblestudytools.com
 Psalm 137 – The Mournful Song of the Exiles enduringword.com
Hymnary.org, Hymns for Psalm 137
 Hebrew text of verses 5–6, translation, transliteration, and recordings on the Zemirot Database
 Psalm 137 at the Bible Gateway, NIV

Babylonia
137